Hinduism is a minority religion in Somalia. It is the third largest religion in the country after Islam and Indigenous religions. As of 2015, there were 8,278 (0.06%) Hindus in the country.

Demographics

According to ARDA, there were 8,278 (0.06%) Hindus in Somalia in the year 2015.

Pew Research projects the Hindu population in Somalia to increase to 11,036 by 2040, although percentage wise it would reduce to 0.04%.

References

Somalia
Hinduism in the Arab world
Religion in Somalia
Somalia